A horse and buggy (in American English) or horse and carriage (in British English and American English) refers to a light, simple, two-person carriage of the late 18th, 19th and early 20th centuries, drawn usually by one or sometimes by two horses. Also called a roadster or a trap, it was made with two wheels in England and the United States (also made with four wheels). It had a folding or falling top.

History

A Concorde buggy, first made in Concord, New Hampshire, had a body with low sides and side-spring suspension. A buggy having two seats was called a double buggy. A buggy called a stanhope typically had a high seat and closed back.

The bodies of buggies were sometimes suspended on a pair of longitudinal elastic wooden bars called sidebars. A buggy whip had a small, usually tasseled tip called a snapper.

In countries such as the United States, the United Kingdom, and Canada, it was a primary mode of short-distance personal transportation, especially between 1815 and 1915. At that time, horseback riding in towns and rural areas was less common and required more specific skills than driving a buggy. Horsemanship tended to be an aristocratic skill of larger American and British landowners, North American western pioneers, the military and scouts. Buggies required at least crudely graded main roadways, where horses could go almost anywhere. The growing use of buggies for local travel expanded, along with stage lines and railroads for longer trips. In cities and towns, horse-drawn railed vehicles gave carriage to poor workers and the lower middle class. The upper middle class used buggies, as did farmers, while the rich had the more elegant 4-wheel carriages for local use. In the late 19th century, bicycles became another factor in urban personal transport.

Until mass production of the automobile brought its price within the reach of the working class, horse-drawn conveyances were the most common means of local transport in towns and nearby countryside. Buggies cost around $25 to $50, and could easily be hitched and driven by untrained men, women, or children. In the United States, hundreds of small companies produced buggies, and their wide use helped to encourage the grading and graveling of main rural roads and actual paving in towns. This provided all-weather passage within and between larger towns.

By the early 1910s, the number of automobiles had surpassed the number of buggies, but their use continued well into the 1920s and even the 1930s in out of the way places.

During the Great Depression of the 1930s, car owners in some parts of the U.S. and Canada used what was called a Bennett buggy (in Canada) – or Hoover wagon (in the U.S.) – namely, an automobile converted to be pulled by horses.

Today
In the 21st century, the buggy is still used as normal, everyday means of transportation by Anabaptists like the Amish, parts of the Old Order Mennonites, a few Old Order River Brethren and parts of the German-speaking "Russian" Mennonites in Latin America but also by the Old Order German Baptist Brethren and Old Brethren German Baptists (both are conservative Schwarzenau Brethren). The style of their buggies, especially the color of the buggy tops (black, grey, brown, yellow, white) can be used to distinguish Old Order communities and can even become part of a group's identity.

Commercial 'horse-and-buggy' rides, mainly for tourists, are conducted with various types of open carriages in some cities, for example in New York City's Central Park area, Michigan's Mackinac Island (where motor vehicles have been banned since 1898), and in Vienna and Brussels.

Gallery

Literature

See also

References

carriages
carts
horse transportation
wagons